Mustafadeen "Mustafa" Abdush-Shakur (born August 18, 1984) is an American former professional basketball player. He played college basketball for the University of Arizona and has previously played professionally in Europe, Lebanon, the NBA D-League and the NBA.

High school career
Shakur attended William Penn High School in Philadelphia as a sophomore in 2000–01, before transferring to Friends' Central School for his junior year. As a junior in 2001–02, he averaged 18.8 points, 6.0 rebounds, 4.0 assists and 2.0 steals per game to lead Friends' Central to the Friends League title. He also earned first team all-state and all-Friends kudos, while claiming second-team all-city and all-public honors.

On November 13, 2002, he signed a National Letter of Intent to play college basketball for the University of Arizona.

As a senior in 2002–03, he averaged 26.8 points, 6.8 assists and 4.1 steals per game while earning USA Today High School Boys all-USA first team, EA Sports All-America, ABCD Camp All-Star and first-team all-state honors. He also earned Gatorade Pennsylvania Player of the Year and McDonald's All-American honors.

College career
In his freshman season at Arizona, Shakur was named to the Pac-10 All-Freshman Team. In 30 games, he averaged 9.4 points, 3.6 rebounds and 4.5 assists per game.

In his sophomore season, he was a member of the preseason Naismith Award watch list, and went on to average 8.1 points, 3.6 rebounds, 4.5 assists and 1.2 steals in 37 games.

In his junior season, he was the only Wildcat to start every game as he ended the season with 455 career assists, a figure that is tied for ninth on the UA career list. In 33 games, he averaged 11.2 points, 3.7 rebounds, 4.7 assists and 1.5 steals per game.

On April 12, 2006, he declared for the NBA draft, but later withdrew his name from consideration on June 18, 2006.

In his senior season, he earned honorable mention all-Pac-10 honors after finishing his career ranked 22nd on the UA career points scored list (1,318), second in assists (670), third in games started (129), fourth in minutes played (4,070), fifth in games played (131), seventh in average minutes per game (31.1), and 10th in steals (156). His 215 assists in 2006–07 was the fourth-highest single-season total in school history, and subsequently finished his career with more assists (670) than any other player in the Lute Olson era. In 31 games, he averaged 11.9 points, 4.0 rebounds, 6.9 assists and 1.5 steals per game.

College statistics

|-
| style="text-align:left;"| 2003–04
| style="text-align:left;"| Arizona
| 30 || 28 || 30.2 || .519 || .396 || .803 || 3.6 || 4.5 || .6 || .0 || 9.4
|-
| style="text-align:left;"| 2004–05
| style="text-align:left;"| Arizona
| 37 || 37 || 28.7 || .423 || .378 || .738 || 3.6 || 4.5 || 1.2 || .1 || 8.1
|-
| style="text-align:left;"| 2005–06
| style="text-align:left;"| Arizona
| 33 || 33 || 30.7 || .423 || .333 || .806 || 3.7 || 4.7 || 1.5 || .1 || 11.2
|-
| style="text-align:left;"| 2006–07
| style="text-align:left;"| Arizona
| 31 || 31 || 34.8 || .455 || .325 || .788 || 4.0 || 6.9 || 1.5 || .2 || 11.9
|-

Professional career

2007–08 season
Shakur went undrafted in the 2007 NBA draft. On July 5, 2007, he signed with the Sacramento Kings and joined them for the 2007 NBA Summer League. However, he was later waived by the Kings on October 31, 2007. The next month, he signed with Prokom Trefl Sopot of Poland for the rest of the season.

2008–09 season
In July 2008, Shakur joined the Charlotte Bobcats for the 2008 NBA Summer League. On September 16, 2008, he signed a one-year deal with TAU Cerámica of the Liga ACB. On January 22, 2009, his contract was terminated by Cerámica. The next day, he signed with Panellinios of Greece for the rest of the season.

2009–10 season
In July 2009, Shakur joined the Los Angeles Lakers for the 2009 NBA Summer League. On September 27, 2009, he signed with the Minnesota Timberwolves. However, he was waived by the Timberwolves on October 19, 2009. On November 5, 2009, he was selected in the second round of the 2009 NBA D-League draft by the Tulsa 66ers.

On March 16, 2010, he signed a 10-day contract with the Oklahoma City Thunder. On March 25, 2010, he was released by the Thunder before playing in a game for them. On March 31, 2010, he signed with the Thunder for the rest of the season, and was immediately assigned back down to the Tulsa 66ers. On April 14, 2010, he was recalled by the Thunder. Two days later, he was reassigned to the 66ers, and again recalled the next day.

2010–11 season
In July 2010, Shakur joined the Oklahoma City Thunder for the 2010 NBA Summer League. On September 8, 2010, he signed with the New Orleans Hornets. However, he was later waived by the Hornets on October 18, 2010. Later that month, he was reacquired by the Tulsa 66ers. On November 2, 2010, he was traded to the Rio Grande Valley Vipers in exchange for Robert Vaden.

On January 22, 2011, he signed a 10-day contract with the Washington Wizards. On February 12, 2011, he signed a second 10-day contract with the Wizards. On February 28, 2011, he signed with the Wizards for the rest of the season.

2011–12 season
On June 27, 2011, Shakur signed with Pau-Orthez of France for the 2011–12 season. On November 14, 2011, he was released by Pau-Orthez after just seven games. The next day, he signed with Novipiù Casale Monferrato of Italy for the rest of the season.

2012–13 season
On September 18, 2012, Shakur signed with Sidigas Avellino of Italy for the 2012–13 season. In January 2013, he parted ways with Sidigas Avellino after 17 games.

On March 5, 2013, he was reacquired by the Rio Grande Valley Vipers. The same day, he was traded to the Erie BayHawks.

2013–14 season
On October 31, 2013, Shakur was reacquired by the Erie BayHawks. On January 22, 2014, he was traded to the Tulsa 66ers.

On March 16, 2014, he signed a 10-day contract with the Oklahoma City Thunder. On March 26, 2014, he was not offered a second 10-day contract by the Thunder after his first 10-day contract expired. Two days later, he returned to the 66ers.

On April 23, 2014, he signed with Tadamon Zouk of Lebanon for the 2013–14 FLB season.

2014–15 season
On September 12, 2014, Shakur signed with Neptūnas of Lithuania for the 2014–15 season. In 45 league games for Neptūnas, he averaged 9.4 points, 3.0 rebounds, 3.5 assists and 1.5 steals per game.

2015–16 season
On October 5, 2016, Shakur signed with German club MHP Riesen Ludwigsburg for the 2015–16 Basketball Bundesliga season.

2016–17 season
On September 16, 2016, Shakur signed with Afyonkarahisar Belediyespor of the Turkish Basketball First League. On January 21, 2017, he left Afyonkarahisar and signed with German club S.Oliver Würzburg for the rest of the 2016–17 Basketball Bundesliga season.

2017–18 season
On January 23, 2018, Shakur signed with Oklahoma City Blue of the NBA G League.

Career statistics

NBA

Regular season

|-
|align="left"| 
|align="left"| Washington
| 22 || 0 || 7.2 || .356 || .100 || .533 || 1.0 || 1.1 || .2 || .1 || 2.3
|-
|align="left"| 
|align="left"| Oklahoma City
| 3 || 0 || 3.7 || .000 || .000 || .500 || .0 || 1.3 || .0 || .0 || .3
|- class="sortbottom"
| style="text-align:left;"| Career
| style="text-align:left;"|
| 25 || 0 || 6.8 || .339 || .091 || .529 || .9 || 1.2 || .2 || .1 || 2.1

Euroleague

|-
| style="text-align:left;"| 2007–08
| style="text-align:left;"| Prokom Trefl Sopot
| 7 || 1 || 18.4 || .382 || .385 || .667 || 2.1 || 2.1 || 0.6 || 0.3 || 7.6 || 3.7
|-
| style="text-align:left;"| 2008–09
| style="text-align:left;"| TAU Cerámica
| 10 || 2 || 13.7 || .425 || .167 || .760 || 1.3 || 1.3 || 0.8 || 0.0 || 5.5 || 4.6
|-
| style="text-align:left;"| 2014–15
| style="text-align:left;"| Neptūnas
| 10 || 10 || 24.8 || .396 || .143 || .875 || 2.3 || 3.8 || 1.2 || 0.0 || 9.6 || 8.7
|- class="sortbottom"
| style="text-align:left;"| Career
| style="text-align:left;"|
| 27 || 13 || 19.0 || .397 || .217 || .793 || 1.9 || 2.4 || 0.9 || 0.1 || 7.6 || 5.8

Eurocup

|-
| style="text-align:left;"| 2008–09
| style="text-align:left;"| Panellinios
| 6 || 0 || 12.2 || .538 || .500 || .615 || 0.8 || 1.2 || 1.0 || 0.0 || 6.3 || 5.7
|-
| style="text-align:left;"| 2014–15
| style="text-align:left;"| Neptūnas
| 6 || 6 || 23.2 || .486 || .333 || .762 || 3.3 || 3.5 || 1.3 || 0.2 || 8.7 || 11.5
|- class="sortbottom"
| style="text-align:left;"| Career
| style="text-align:left;"|
| 12 || 6 || 17.6 || .508 || .400 || .706 || 2.1 || 2.3 || 1.2 || 0.1 || 7.5 || 8.5

NBA D-League

Regular season

|-
| style="text-align:left;"| 2009–10
| style="text-align:left;"| Tulsa
| 47 || 47 || 37.8 || .488 || .382 || .747 || 4.5 || 6.9 || 2.3 || .2 || 19.3
|-
| style="text-align:left;"| 2010–11
| style="text-align:left;"| Rio Grande Valley
| 23 || 23 || 36.4 || .488 || .320 || .711 || 4.7 || 5.0 || 1.9 || .3 || 16.7
|-
| style="text-align:left;"| 2012–13
| style="text-align:left;"| Erie
| 7 || 7 || 37.8 || .441 || .353 || .800 || 4.4 || 5.6 || 2.3 || .3 || 17.1
|-
| style="text-align:left;"| 2013–14
| style="text-align:left;"| Erie
| 17 || 17 || 32.2 || .492 || .361 || .761 || 3.6 || 5.4 || 1.1 || .2 || 14.6
|-
| style="text-align:left;"| 2013–14
| style="text-align:left;"| Tulsa
| 23 || 22 || 36.4 || .467 || .300 || .840 || 5.0 || 6.8 || 2.3 || .4 || 14.6
|- class="sortbottom"
| style="text-align:left;"| Career
| style="text-align:left;"|
| 117 || 116 || 36.5 || .481 || .344 || .764 || 4.5 || 6.2 || 2.0 || .3 || 17.9

Playoffs

|-
| style="text-align:left;"| 2009–10
| style="text-align:left;"| Tulsa
| 4 || 4 || 32.9 || .510 || .375 || .786 || 4.5 || 3.8 || 2.0 || 1.0 || 16.0
|- class="sortbottom"
| style="text-align:left;"| Career
| style="text-align:left;"|
| 4 || 4 || 32.9 || .510 || .375 || .786 || 4.5 || 3.8 || 2.0 || 1.0 || 16.0

International career
Shakur was a member of the 2003 USA Basketball Men's Junior National Team, which finished fifth at the World Championships with a 7-1 record. He averaged 5.0 points, 1.1 rebounds and 2.8 assists during the eight-game tournament in Thessaloniki, Greece, where his best effort was a 10-point (4-of-7 FG), four-assist, five-steal performance vs. Slovenia on July 19.

In 2004, he helped the USA World Championship for Young Men Qualifying team post a 5-0 record and win the gold medal by averaging 3.0 points, 1.3 rebounds and 0.5 assists per game during the tournament in Halifax, Nova Scotia, Canada. His best effort was a six-point, two-rebound, two-assist performance in USA's 87-64 win over Brazil on July 29.

References

External links

NBA D-League Profile
Euroleague.net Profile
DraftExpress.com Profile

1984 births
Living people
African-American basketball players
American expatriate basketball people in France
American expatriate basketball people in Germany
American expatriate basketball people in Greece
American expatriate basketball people in Italy
American expatriate basketball people in Lebanon
American expatriate basketball people in Lithuania
American expatriate basketball people in Poland
American expatriate basketball people in Spain
American expatriate basketball people in Turkey
A.S. Junior Pallacanestro Casale players
Arizona Wildcats men's basketball players
Afyonkarahisar Belediyespor players
Basketball players from Philadelphia
Élan Béarnais players
Erie BayHawks (2008–2017) players
Liga ACB players
McDonald's High School All-Americans
Riesen Ludwigsburg players
BC Neptūnas players
Oklahoma City Blue players
Oklahoma City Thunder players
Panellinios B.C. players
Point guards
Rio Grande Valley Vipers players
S.Oliver Würzburg players
S.S. Felice Scandone players
Saski Baskonia players
Sportspeople from Montgomery County, Pennsylvania
Tulsa 66ers players
Undrafted National Basketball Association players
Washington Wizards players
Asseco Gdynia players
American men's basketball players
Friends' Central School alumni
21st-century African-American sportspeople
20th-century African-American people